Zinc finger protein 263 is a protein that in humans is encoded by the ZNF263 gene.

References

Further reading